Elections to Carrickfergus Borough Council were held on 21 May 1997 on the same day as the other Northern Irish local government elections. The election used three district electoral areas to elect a total of 17 councillors.

Election results

Note: "Votes" are the first preference votes.

Districts summary

|- class="unsortable" align="centre"
!rowspan=2 align="left"|Ward
! % 
!Cllrs
! % 
!Cllrs
! %
!Cllrs
! %
!Cllrs
!rowspan=2|TotalCllrs
|- class="unsortable" align="center"
!colspan=2 bgcolor="" | Alliance
!colspan=2 bgcolor="" | UUP
!colspan=2 bgcolor="" | DUP
!colspan=2 bgcolor="white"| Others
|-
|align="left"|Carrick Castle
|28.8
|1
|16.9
|1
|22.7
|1
|bgcolor="#DDDDDD"|31.6
|bgcolor="#DDDDDD"|2
|5
|-
|align="left"|Kilroot
|25.5
|2
|17.2
|1
|14.5
|1
|bgcolor=#0077FF|42.8
|bgcolor=#0077FF|2
|6
|-
|align="left"|Knockagh Monument
|28.6
|2
|bgcolor="40BFF5"|30.0
|bgcolor="40BFF5"|2
|24.3
|1
|17.1
|1
|6
|-
|- class="unsortable" class="sortbottom" style="background:#C9C9C9"
|align="left"| Total
|27.4
|5
|21.6
|4
|20.0
|3
|31.0
|5
|17
|-
|}

Districts results

Carrick Castle

1993: 2 x Alliance, 1 x DUP, 1 x UUP, 1 x Independent
1997: 2 x Independent, 1 x Alliance, 1 x DUP, 1 x UUP
1993-1997 Change: Independent gain from Alliance

Kilroot

1993: 2 x Alliance, 2 x UUP, 1 x Conservative, 1 x Independent Unionist
1997: 2 x Alliance, 2 x Independent Unionist, 1 x UUP, 1 x DUP
1993-1997 Change: DUP gain from Independent Unionist, Independent Unionists leave UUP and Conservatives

Knockagh Monument

1993: 2 x UUP, 2 x Alliance, 1 x DUP, 1 x Independent Unionist
1997: 2 x UUP, 2 x Alliance, 1 x DUP, 1 x Independent Unionist
1993-1997 Change: No change

References

Carrickfergus Borough Council elections
Carrickfergus